1113 Katja, provisional designation , is a background asteroid from the outer regions of the asteroid belt, approximately 39 kilometers in diameter. It was discovered by Pelageya Shajn at the Simeiz Observatory in 1928, and named after Ekaterina Iosko, a staff member at the discovering observatory.

Discovery 

Katja was discovered on 15 August 1928, by Soviet astronomer Pelageya Shajn at the Simeiz Observatory on the Crimean peninsula. Nine nights later, it was independently discovered by Max Wolf at the German Heidelberg Observatory on 24 August 1928. The Minor Planet Center only recognizes the first discoverer.

Orbit and classification 

Katja is a non-family asteroid of the main belt's background population. It orbits the Sun in the outer asteroid belt at a distance of 2.7–3.6 AU once every 5 years and 6 months (2,004 days; semi-major axis of 3.11 AU). Its orbit has an eccentricity of 0.14 and an inclination of 13° with respect to the ecliptic. The body's observation arc begins at Heidelberg, 10 days after its official discovery observation at Simeiz.

Physical characteristics 

Although Katja is an assumed, carbonaceous C-type asteroid, it is rather of stony composition due to its high albedo.

Rotation period 

Between 2002 and 2011, several rotational lightcurves of Katja were obtained from photometric observations by French amateur astronomers Maurice Audejean, René Roy and Laurent Brunetto. Best rated lightcurve, however, was obtained at the Sunflower, Blackberry and Universidad de Monterrey observatories in January 2002. Lightcurve analysis gave a well-defined synodic rotation period of 18.465 hours with a brightness amplitude of 0.17 magnitude.

Diameter and albedo 

According to the surveys carried out by the Infrared Astronomical Satellite IRAS, the Japanese Akari satellite and the NEOWISE mission of NASA's Wide-field Infrared Survey Explorer, Katja measures between 38.20 and 51.949 kilometers in diameter and its surface has an albedo between 0.1144 and 0.211.

The Collaborative Asteroid Lightcurve Link derives an albedo of 0.2253 and a diameter of 38.65 kilometers based on an absolute magnitude of 9.3.

Naming 

This minor planet was named for Ekaterina ("Katja") Iosko, a laboratory assistant and orbit calculator at the discovering Simeiz Observatory. She was the daughter of Iosif Gavrilovich Iosko, who also worked as a mechanician at the observatory.

References

External links 
 Asteroid Lightcurve Database (LCDB), query form (info )
 Dictionary of Minor Planet Names, Google books
 Asteroids and comets rotation curves, CdR – Observatoire de Genève, Raoul Behrend
 Discovery Circumstances: Numbered Minor Planets (1)-(5000) – Minor Planet Center
 
 

001113
Discoveries by Pelageya Shajn
Named minor planets
19280815